George Craven (born 1917, date of death unknown) was an English professional footballer who played as a goalkeeper in the Football League for York City, and in non-League football for Fishergate Old Boys.

References

1917 births
Year of death missing
Footballers from York
Date of birth missing
English footballers
Association football goalkeepers
York City F.C. players
English Football League players